Under the Constitution of the Philippines, the president of the Philippines is both the head of state and government, and serves as the commander-in-chief of the country's armed forces. The president is directly elected by qualified voters to a six-year term and must be "a natural-born citizen of the Philippines, a registered voter, able to read and write, at least forty years of age on the day of the election, and a resident of the Philippines for at least ten years immediately preceding such election". Any person who has served as president for more than six years is barred from eligibility. Upon resignation, or removal from office, the vice president assumes the post.

History
Emilio Aguinaldo became the inaugural president of the Philippines under the Malolos Republic, considered the First Philippine Republic. He held that office until 1901 when he was captured by United States forces during the Philippine–American War (1899–1902). The American colonization of the Philippines abolished the First Republic, which led to an American governor-general exercising executive power.

In 1935, the United States, pursuant to its promise of full Philippine sovereignty, established the Commonwealth of the Philippines following the ratification of the 1935 Constitution, which also restored the presidency. The first national presidential election was held, and Manuel L. Quezon (1935–44) was elected to a six-year term, with no provision for re-election, as the second Philippine president and the first Commonwealth president. In 1940, however, the Constitution was amended to allow re-election but shortened the term to four years. A change in government occurred three years later when the Second Philippine Republic was organized with the enactment of the 1943 Constitution, which Japan imposed after it occupied the Philippines in 1942 during World WarII. José P. Laurel acted as puppet president of the new Japanese-sponsored government; his de facto presidency, not legally recognized until the 1960s, overlapped with that of the president of the Commonwealth, which went into exile. The Second Republic was dissolved after Japan surrendered to the Allies in 1945; the Commonwealth was restored in the Philippines in the same year with Sergio Osmeña (1944–46) as president.

Manuel Roxas (1946–1948) followed Osmeña when he won the first post-war election in 1946. He became the first president of the independent Philippines when the Commonwealth ended on July4 of that year. The Third Republic was ushered in and would cover the administrations of the next five presidents, the last of which was Ferdinand Marcos (1965–86), who performed a self-coup by imposing martial law in 1972. The dictatorship of Marcos saw the birth of the New Society and the Fourth Republic. His tenure lasted until 1986 when he was deposed in the People Power Revolution. The current constitution came into effect in 1987, marking the beginning of the Fifth Republic.

Of the individuals elected as president, three died in office: two of natural causes (Manuel L. Quezon and Manuel Roxas) and one in a plane crash (Ramon Magsaysay, 1953–57). The shortest is Sergio Osmeña, who spent  in office.

Two women have held the office: Corazon Aquino (1986–92), who ascended to the presidency upon the successful People Power Revolution of 1986, and Gloria Macapagal Arroyo (2001–10), who, as vice president, ascended to the presidency upon Estrada's resignation and was elected to a full six-year term in 2004.

Presidents

Timeline

Unofficial presidents 
Andrés Bonifacio is considered by some historians to be the first president of the Philippines. He was the third Supreme President (Spanish: Presidente Supremo; Tagalog: Kataastaasang Pangulo)  of the Katipunan secret society. Its Supreme Council, led by the Supreme President, coordinated provincial and district councils. When the Katipunan went into open revolt in August 1896 (the Cry of Balintawak), Bonifacio transformed it into a revolutionary government with him as president. While the term Katipunan remained, Bonifacio's government was also known as the Tagalog Republic (Tagalog: Republika ng Katagalugan; Spanish: Republica Tagala). (Although the word Tagalog refers to a specific ethnicity, Bonifacio used it to denote all indigenous people in the Philippines in place of Filipino which had colonial origins.)

Some historians contend that including Bonifacio as a past president would imply that Macario Sakay and Miguel Malvar y Carpio should also be included. Miguel Malvar y Carpio continued Emilio Aguinaldo's leadership of the First Philippine Republic after the latter's capture until his own capture in 1902. Macario Sakay revived the Tagalog Republic in 1902 as a continuation of Bonifacio's Katipunan. They are both considered by some scholars as "unofficial presidents". Along with Bonifacio, Malvar and Sakay are not recognized as presidents by the Philippine government.

Emilio Aguinaldo is officially recognized as the first president of the Philippines, but this is based on his term of office during the Malolos Republic, later known as the First Philippine Republic. Prior to this Aguinaldo had held the presidency of several revolutionary governments which are not counted in the succession of Philippine republics.

Manuel L. Quezon delegated his presidential duties to José Abad Santos, the then Chief Justice, when the former fled the Philippines amidst Japanese occupation of the islands to establish a government-in-exile. He is believed to have in effect become the acting president of the Philippine Commonwealth though no legal document has been retrieved detailing the official transfer of the title of President to Abad Santos.

List

Timeline

Notes

Subnotes

Other notes

References

Works cited

External links

Presidential Website
Office of the President of the Philippines
Presidential Museum and Library
Philippines at worldstatesmen.org+

Lists of national presidents
Presidents
 
Unofficial Presidents of the Philippines